Sugar-Salem High School is a four-year public secondary school in Sugar City, Idaho, the only traditional high school of the Sugar-Salem Joint School District #322 in Madison County. The school colors are royal blue and white and the mascot is a digger, a reference to sugar beet cultivation.

The school district takes in students from the surrounding area, from the local non-census designated communities of Salem (mostly inside Madison County, but partially straddling Fremont County) and Plano on the west to beyond the town of Newdale on the east. On the north, it borders Fremont County, following the Snake River tributary known as Henrys Fork. On the south, it borders Madison School District and the city of Rexburg.

History
Sugar-Salem High School was built in 1989. The high school was previously housed in what is now Sugar-Salem Junior High School.

Academic Awards

Sugar-Salem High School has received academic awards including a bronze medal on the U.S. News & World Report List of America’s Best High Schools in 2008 and was listed as a top school in Redbook Magazine in 1994. Sugar Salem High School has a graduation rate of 97 percent. In 2013, it became a National Blue Ribbon School.

Athletics
Sugar-Salem competes in athletics in IHSAA Class 3A and is a member of the Mountain Rivers Conference. It has received many sportsmanship awards in boys’ and girls’ basketball, volleyball, cross country, wrestling, track & field, and soccer.

State titles
Boys
 Football (1): fall 2022
 Cross Country (1): fall (3A) 2009  (introduced in 1964)
 Soccer (2):fall 2021, 2022 (introduced in 2000) 
 Basketball (5): (AA, now 3A) 1962; (A-3, now 2A) 1973; (A-2, now 3A) 1993, 1994, (3A) 2017 
 Wrestling (10): (A-3, now 2A) 1984, 1986, 1991; (A-2, now 3A) 1992, 1993, 1996, 1997, 2000; (3A) 2002, 2003, 2017  (introduced in 1958)
 Track (3): (3A)2015

Girls
 Cross Country (2): fall (3A) 2012, 2013 (introduced in 1974)
 Soccer (0): fall   (introduced in 2000)
 Volleyball (5): fall (A-3, now 2A) 1990; (3A) 2003, 2006, 2007, 2008  (introduced in 1976)
 Basketball (8): (A-3, now 2A) 1991; (3A) 2007, 2009, 2011, 2015 (introduced in 1976)
 Track (9): (A-3, now 2A) 1983, 1985, 1986; (3A) 2007, 2008, 2010, 2012, 2013, 2014 (introduced in 1971)

Notable alumni
Harold G. Hillam - Emeritus General Authority of the Church of Jesus Christ of Latter-day Saints, former member of the Presidency of the Seventy
Mack Shirley, Idaho State Representative
Laurel Thatcher Ulrich, Pulitzer-prize winning author of A Midwife's Tale

See also

List of high schools in Idaho

References

External links

 Sugar-Salem School District

Public high schools in Idaho
Schools in Madison County, Idaho
1989 establishments in Idaho
Educational institutions established in 1989